The reading public for Senegal's diverse press is largely limited to Dakar and Thies. Le Soleil is the quasi-official daily. Other major popular independent newspapers include the dailies Sud Quotidien, WalFadjri, Le Quotidien, Le Matin, Le Populaire, Il Est Midi, and the economic weekly Nouvel Horizon. National newspapers are in French. English-language newspapers such as the International Herald Tribune are also available at many newsstands. 
Various trade organizations publish bulletins and newsletters such as those of the Dakar Chamber of Commerce and the periodical Entreprendre issued by the National Council of Business Leaders.

Newspapers
Below is the list of the main newspapers published in Senegal. All are in French, unless otherwise indicated

Defunct

See also
 Media of Senegal
 List of radio stations in Senegal
 List of radio stations in Africa
 Television in Senegal
Telecommunications in Senegal

References

Bibliography

External links
 

 
Senegal
newspapers